Actor Arashi Rikan II as Osome is an ukiyo-e woodblock print by Osaka print artist  (1802 – 1853). It depicts late Edo period kabuki actor, Arashi Rikan II as the lead female character in a scene from a popular play of the period. The print belongs to the permanent collection of the Prince Takamado Gallery of Japanese Art in the Royal Ontario Museum, Canada.

Print details

 Medium:  woodblock print; ink and colour on paper
 Format: tate-e vertical print
 Genre: kabuki-e, yakusha-e 
 Japanese title: 
 Exhibit title: Actor Arashi Rikan II as Osome
 Inscription: none
 Signature:  in bottom right corner 
 Publisher's mark: 天喜 (Tenki)
 Publisher's seal: 天 (Tenki) 
 Censor seal: none
 Date seal: none
 Credit line: none

Artist

 (1802/3–1853) was born in Nagasaki, Kyushu. He moved to Osaka around 1820, and began studying under  (fl. c.1815-1841), then  (1787–1832). He published his first print in 1820 under the name , and used various gō throughout his career. He took the name Ryūsai Shigeharu in 1825. He worked in various media including single-sheet prints, book illustration, theater billboards and programs, and painting. He was active during the period c.1820-1849, and prints signed Kunishige and Shigeharu from 1849 on are likely the work of other artists.

Although contemporary accounts characterize him as "good at everything" and "better than the rest," modern critics have described him as "an indifferent artist". This notwithstanding, Shigeharu was, if not the only professional ukiyo-e artist working in Osaka in the late nineteenth-century, one of the very few on the amateur-dominated art scene.

Publisher

The print displays the publisher's mark associated with Tenki. The seal is a stylized version of the character 天 (ten) contained within a circle. The Tenki seal version appearing in this print was used from 1826 to 1838.

Medium and genre

This term was used to distinguish prints produced in the Kamigata region (Kyoto and Osaka) from those produced in Edo. Gaining prominence about a century after the appearance of ukiyo-e in Edo, kamigata-e belonged mainly to the kabuki-e genre (images of kabuki actors), and were almost entirely the work of non-professional “talented kabuki fans” celebrating their heroes. Shigeharu was a rare exception to this rule.

Format

The image is a vertical   single-sheet print. As the print depicts one half of the romantic duo in a famous love story, and as the signatures, seals and inscriptions are all located on the extreme right of the print, it may have been the right-side half of a diptych.

Subject

Arashi Rikan II
After spending the first two decades of his career on the stages of Osaka's minor  theatres,  (1788-1837) went on to become a celebrated kabuki actor specializing in  male roles. In 1828, he took the name Rikan II. He worked until his death in 1837, and was buried on the grounds of Osaka’s Jōgen-ji Temple. The Arashi Rikan line continued into the fifth generation, dying out in 1920.

Though small in stature, Rikan II was famous for his striking eyes. He was given the moniker , me meaning 'eyes' and toku meaning 'virtue.' He was the particular favourite of artist Shunbaisai Hokuei (fl. c.1824-1837) and appears in most of his prints.

Osome
Originally written for the  puppet theatre, it was adapted for the kabuki stage in 1782. It is one of several dramas recounting the tragic true story of two star-crossed lovers who committed double-suicide in 1710, one the daughter of a merchant, the other, her father's apprentice. Osome was a popular subject for yakusha-e artists and often depicted wearing a kimono decorated with hemp flowers.

Rikan II appeared in this role at Osaka's Kado theatre in the ninth lunar month of 1830, and it is likely that this print was completed in celebration of this performance. He reprised the role at the Kitagawa theatre in the eleventh lunar month of 1832, which was memorialized in a print by Shunbaisai Hokuei.

Description

Osome appears in a moment of tension. It is night and she is leaving the grounds of her home. In contrast with the complete darkness of the house behind her, she carries a lit lantern and wears a dark but colourful patterned kimono. Beyond the figure of Osome herself, there is very little detail. The ground is made up of yellow horizontal lines on a brown background, and the sky is coloured with the bokashi technique of colour gradation, darkening from light grey to black as it reaches the top edge of the print. Osome looks up to her left with an uneasy facial expression, her gaze resting somewhere beyond the right border of the print.

Related works

See also

 View of Tempōzan Park in Naniwa (Gochōtei Sadamasu) - kamigata-e print in same collection
 Ryūsai Shigeharu
 Two Actors in Samurai Roles (Gosotei Hirosada) - kamigata-e print in same collection

Notes

External links

References

 

 

 

 

 

 

 

 

 

 

 

 

 

 

 

 

 

Works by Ryūsai Shigeharu